Richard Lewington may refer to:

 Richard Lewington (diplomat) (born 1948), former British ambassador
 Richard Lewington (artist) (born 1951), wildlife artist